José Hernán Sánchez Porras (March 31, 1944 – October 13, 2014) was a Roman Catholic bishop.

Ordained to the priesthood on June 25, 1967, Sánchez Porras was named bishop of the Military Ordinariate of Venezuela on December 19, 2000 and was ordained bishop on 16 February 2001.

Notes

1944 births
2014 deaths
Venezuelan Roman Catholic bishops
Roman Catholic military bishops of Venezuela